Luminous efficacy is a measure of how well a light source produces visible light. It is the ratio of luminous flux to power, measured in lumens per watt in the International System of Units (SI). Depending on context, the power can be either the radiant flux of the source's output, or it can be the total power (electric power, chemical energy, or others) consumed by the source.
Which sense of the term is intended must usually be inferred from the context, and is sometimes unclear. The former sense is sometimes called luminous efficacy of radiation, and the latter luminous efficacy of a light source or overall luminous efficacy.

Not all wavelengths of light are equally visible, or equally effective at stimulating human vision, due to the spectral sensitivity of the human eye; radiation in the infrared and ultraviolet parts of the spectrum is useless for illumination. The luminous efficacy of a source is the product of how well it converts energy to electromagnetic radiation, and how well the emitted radiation is detected by the human eye.

Efficacy and efficiency
Luminous efficacy can be normalized by the maximum possible luminous efficacy to a dimensionless quantity called luminous efficiency. The distinction between efficacy and efficiency is not always carefully maintained in published sources, so it is not uncommon to see "efficiencies" expressed in lumens per watt, or "efficacies" expressed as a percentage.

Luminous efficacy of radiation

Explanation

Wavelengths of light outside of the visible spectrum are not useful for illumination because they cannot be seen by the human eye. Furthermore, the eye responds more to some wavelengths of light than others, even within the visible spectrum. This response of the eye is represented by the luminosity function. This is a standardized function which represents the response of a "typical" eye under bright conditions (photopic vision). One can also define a similar curve for dim conditions (scotopic vision). When neither is specified, photopic conditions are generally assumed.

Luminous efficacy of radiation measures the fraction of electromagnetic power which is useful for lighting. It is obtained by dividing the luminous flux by the radiant flux. Light with wavelengths outside the visible spectrum reduces luminous efficacy, because it contributes to the radiant flux while the luminous flux of such light is zero. Wavelengths near the peak of the eye's response contribute more strongly than those near the edges.

Mathematical definition
Luminous efficacy, denoted K, is defined as
 

where
 Φv is the luminous flux;
 Φe is the radiant flux;
 Φe,λ is the spectral radiant flux;
  is the spectral luminous efficacy.

Examples

Photopic vision

Scotopic vision

Lighting efficiency  

Artificial light sources are usually evaluated in terms of luminous efficacy of the source, also sometimes called wall-plug efficacy. This is the ratio between the total luminous flux emitted by a device and the total amount of input power (electrical, etc.) it consumes. The luminous efficacy of the source is a measure of the efficiency of the device with the output adjusted to account for the spectral response curve (the luminosity function). When expressed in dimensionless form (for example, as a fraction of the maximum possible luminous efficacy), this value may be called luminous efficiency of a source, overall luminous efficiency or lighting efficiency.

The main difference between the luminous efficacy of radiation and the luminous efficacy of a source is that the latter accounts for input energy that is lost as heat or otherwise exits the source as something other than electromagnetic radiation. Luminous efficacy of radiation is a property of the radiation emitted by a source. Luminous efficacy of a source is a property of the source as a whole.

Examples
The following table lists luminous efficacy of a source and efficiency for various light sources. Note that all lamps requiring electrical/electronic ballast are unless noted (see also voltage) listed without losses for that, reducing total efficiency.

Sources that depend on thermal emission from a solid filament, such as incandescent light bulbs, tend to have low overall efficacy because, as explained by Donald L. Klipstein, "An ideal thermal radiator produces visible light most efficiently at temperatures around 6300 °C (6600 K or 11,500 °F). Even at this high temperature, a lot of the radiation is either infrared or ultraviolet, and the theoretical luminous [efficacy] is 95 lumens per watt. No substance is solid and usable as a light bulb filament at temperatures anywhere close to this. The surface of the sun is not quite that hot." At temperatures where the tungsten filament of an ordinary light bulb remains solid (below 3683 kelvin), most of its emission is in the infrared.

SI photometry units

See also
 Photometry
 Light pollution
 Wall-plug efficiency
 Coefficient of utilization
 List of light sources

Notes

References

External links
 Hyperphysics has these graphs of efficacy that do not quite comply with the standard definition
 Energy Efficient Light Bulbs
 Other Power

Photometry
Physical quantities
Lighting
Energy economics